Allison Elizabeth Weston (born February 19, 1974) is a former indoor volleyball player. She won the 1995 national championship while playing for the University of Nebraska and also played for the United States national team at the 2000 Summer Olympics.

Career

High school
Weston attended Papillion-La Vista Senior High School, where she played volleyball, basketball, track and field,(high jump)  and soccer. In 1992, she was named the Lincoln Journal Star Nebraska Athlete of the Year and the Gatorade Nebraska Player of the Year in basketball. She was inducted into the Nebraska High School Sports Hall of Fame in 2007.

College
Weston played for the University of Nebraska volleyball team from 1992 to 1995. In her freshman season, she was named the Big 8 Conference Newcomer of the Year. The following year, she was an AVCA All-American and an All-Big 8 Conference selection.

In both 1994 and 1995, Weston was named the Big 8 Conference Player of the Year, while also making the AVCA All-American and All-Big 8 Conference teams. She led Nebraska to the national championship in 1995 and was an AVCA co-National Player of the Year. She finished her college career with 1,778 kills, which set a Nebraska school record. In 1996, she won the Honda Sports Award as the nation's best female collegiate volleyball player.

Later career
Weston played for the United States national team from 1997 to 2000. She was named the team captain in 1999 and played in the 2000 Summer Olympics.

Weston played professionally in Italy in 2001. She later became an assistant coach for the University of Montana.

Sports Illustrated named her as the best ever female athlete born in Nebraska.

Personal
Weston was born in Papillion, Nebraska, on February 19, 1974. She is 6 feet tall.

References

1974 births
Living people
People from Papillion, Nebraska
Volleyball players at the 2000 Summer Olympics
Olympic volleyball players of the United States
Nebraska Cornhuskers women's volleyball players
Sportspeople from Nebraska
American women's volleyball players
21st-century American women
Pan American Games medalists in volleyball
Pan American Games bronze medalists for the United States
Medalists at the 1999 Pan American Games